Northwood Lake is a  water body located in Rockingham and Merrimack counties in central New Hampshire, United States, in the towns of Northwood and Epsom. The town of Deerfield occupies part of the southern shore. The outlet of the lake is the Little Suncook River, flowing west to the Suncook River, a tributary of the Merrimack River.

The lake is classified as a warmwater fishery, with observed species including smallmouth and largemouth bass, chain pickerel, and brown bullhead, and white perch.

Milfoil is present in the lake.

See also

List of lakes in New Hampshire

References

External links
Northwood Lake Watershed Association (NLWA)
Pine Point Park (formed 1964)

Lakes of Merrimack County, New Hampshire
Lakes of Rockingham County, New Hampshire